Pavlovo, also known as Pavlovo-na-Oke, is a town and the administrative center of Pavlovsky District in Nizhny Novgorod Oblast, Russia, located on the right bank of Oka River in the northwestern part of the Volga Upland. As of the 2010 Census, its population was 60,698.

History
Pavlovo was first mentioned in a letter by Ivan the Terrible dated April 15, 1566 which is considered to be the founding year of the town.

Administrative and municipal status
Within the framework of administrative divisions, Pavlovo serves as the administrative center of Pavlovsky District. As an administrative division, it is incorporated within Pavlovsky District as the town of district significance of Pavlovo. As a municipal division, the town of district significance of Pavlovo is incorporated within Pavlovsky Municipal District as Pavlovo Urban Settlement.

Economy
Pavlovo has a long tradition of metalworking industries. One of the main enterprises in the city is Pavlovo Bus Plant (PAZ).

Agriculture
Lemon trees suitable for indoor cultivation were developed in Pavlovo in the 19th century and are grown throughout Russia.

References

Notes

Sources

 
Cities and towns in Nizhny Novgorod Oblast
Gorbatovsky Uyezd